The women's 50 metre freestyle event at the 2015 African Games took place on 10 September 2015 at Kintele Aquatic Complex.

Schedule
All times are Congo Standard Time (UTC+01:00)

Records

Results

Heats 
The heats were held on 10 September.

Final 
The final were held on 10 September.

References

External links
Official website

Swimming at the 2015 African Games
2015 in women's swimming